United States gubernatorial elections were held on 8 November 1960, in 27 states concurrent with the House, Senate elections and presidential election.

In Minnesota, this was the last election on a 2-year cycle, before switching to a 4-year term for governors.

Results

See also 
1960 United States elections
1960 United States presidential election
1960 United States Senate elections
1960 United States House of Representatives elections

Notes

References 

 
November 1960 events in the United States